The 1992 Nigerian Senate election in Cross River State was held on July 4, 1992, to elect members of the Nigerian Senate to represent Cross River State. Patrick Offiong Ali representing Cross River South, Liyel Imoke representing Cross River Central and Paul Oluohu Ukpo representing Cross River North all won on the platform of the National Republican Convention.

Overview

Summary

Results

Cross River South 
The election was won by Patrick Offiong Ali of the National Republican Convention.

Cross River Central 
The election was won by Liyel Imoke of the National Republican Convention.

Cross River North 
The election was won by Paul Oluohu Ukpo of the National Republican Convention.

References 

Cro
Cross River State Senate elections
July 1992 events in Nigeria